Roadgame (subtitled Recorded in Performance at Maiden Voyage, Los Angeles) is a live album by saxophonist Art Pepper recorded in 1981 at the Maiden Voyage nightclub in Los Angeles and released on the Galaxy label.

Reception

The AllMusic review by Scott Yanow noted "Although only a year away from his death, the great Art Pepper was still very much in his prime for this memorable outing".

Track listing 
All compositions by Art Pepper except where noted.
 "Roadgame" - 9:30
 "Road Waltz" 	10:55
 "When You're Smiling" (Larry Shay, Mark Fisher, Joe Goodwin) - 8:46
 "Everything Happens to Me" (Matt Dennis, Tom Adair) - 12:04 
 "Roadgame" [alternate take] - 11:02 Bonus track on CD reissue

Personnel 
Art Pepper - alto saxophone (tracks 1, 2, 4 & 5), clarinet (track 3)
George Cables - piano 
David Williams - bass 
Carl Burnett - drums

References 

Art Pepper live albums
1982 live albums
Galaxy Records live albums